The 1903 season was the second season of competitive football in Brazil.

Campeonato Paulista

First Stage

Final

São Paulo Athletic declared as the Campeonato Paulista champions.

References

 Brazilian competitions at RSSSF

 
Seasons in Brazilian football
Brazil